The 2015 IBSF World Snooker Championship is an amateur snooker tournament that took place from 9 November to 21 November 2015 in Hurghada, Egypt. It was the 41st edition of the IBSF World Snooker Championship and also doubled as a qualification event for the World Snooker Tour.

The event was originally due to take place in Sharm el-Sheikh, however due to the Metrojet Flight 9268 crash the tournament was relocated to Hurghada. Because of this many competitors withdrew from the competition amid safety fears, Including the entire Libyan, Russian, South Korean and Sri Lankan teams. This ended up leaving some of the groups featuring as little as four players who would subsequently all qualify for the knockout stage of the tournament regardless of their results in the group stage.

The final would go on to feature a contest between 2003 IBSF World Snooker Champion Pankaj Advani and Chinese player Zhao Xintong who had previously reached the 2013 IBSF World Snooker Championship final before losing 8–4 to fellow country man Zhou Yuelong.

Number 6 seed Advani would eventually go on to win the championship defeating Xintong 8–6 in the final. Following the tournaments result Advani was offered a two-year card on the professional World Snooker Tour for the 2016/2017 and 2017/2018 seasons. Advani had previously played on World Snooker Tour up until September 2014, when he announced that he was relinquishing his snooker tour card in order to concentrate on his billiards career and spend more time with his family.

Results

Group Round

Group A

Group B

Group C

Group D

Group E

Group F

Group G

Group H

Group J

Group K

Group L

Group M

Group N

Group P

Group Q

Group R

Group S

Group T

Group U

Group V

Group W

Group X

Knockout rounds

Round 1
Best of 7 frames

Round 2
Best of 7 frames

Finals

Century breaks

 141, 109, 108, 106, 105  Pankaj Advani
 136, 108  Brian Cini
 130, 102  Issara Kachaiwong
 127  Basem Eltahhan
 126, 119, 116, 108, 105  Zhao Xintong
 126  Saqib Nasir
 122  Mohd Reza Hassan
 122  Shahram Changezi
 122  Alex Borg
 120  Alex Taubman

 119  Muhammad Sajjad
 115  Ryan Thomerson
 110  Amir Sarkhosh
 109, 108  Soheil Vahedi
 109  Faisal Khan
 107  Ben Jones
 103, 102  Lee Chun Wai
 102  Aaron Busuttil
 102  Michael Collumb
 101  Karam Fatima

References

2015 in snooker
Snooker amateur tournaments
Hurghada
2015 in Egyptian sport
International sports competitions hosted by Egypt